Sebascodegan Island or Great Island is an island at the eastern edge of Casco Bay on the Gulf of Maine.  It is a part of the town of Harpswell with the mainland portion of Harpswell to its west and Orr's Island and Bailey Island to its south. The town of Brunswick occupies the mainland to the north, and the towns of West Bath and Phippsburg occupy the mainland to the east, across the New Meadows River.

References

Islands of Cumberland County, Maine
Harpswell, Maine
Islands of Casco Bay
Islands of Maine